Astral Aviation is a cargo airline based in Nairobi, Kenya. It was established in November 2000 and started operations in January 2001. It operates scheduled and non-scheduled/ad hoc cargo charters to regional destinations in Africa and to Liège in Belgium. Its main base is Jomo Kenyatta International Airport, Nairobi.

Destinations
Astral shows the following scheduled destinations in their 2017 online timetable.

Belgium
Liège Airport
Rwanda
Kigali International Airport
Somalia
Hargeisa International Airport
Mogadishu International Airport
South Sudan
Juba Airport
Tanzania
Dar Es Salaam Airport
Mwanza Airport
Zanzibar International Airport
United Kingdom
London Stansted Airport

Fleet

Current fleet
, The Astral Aviation fleet consists of the following aircraft:

Former fleet
The airline previously operated the following aircraft (as of March 2015):
 2 Boeing 737-400F
 1 Boeing 747-400F, leased from Atlas Air
 1 Fokker 27-500F, leased from AeroSpace Consortium
 1 Fokker 27F

Awards
Africa all Cargo Carrier of the year: 2011
Africa all Cargo Carrier of the year: 2013
Africa all Cargo Carrier of the year: 2015
Africa all Cargo Carrier of the year: 2017
Africa all Cargo Carrier of the year: 2019

References

External links

Airlines of Kenya
Airlines established in 2000
Cargo airlines of Kenya
Kenyan companies established in 2000